M is a 2007 South Korean psychological drama film starring Gang Dong-won. The film premiered at the Toronto International Film Festival, and the final cut had its Korean premiere at the Pusan International Film Festival.

Using visual effects, complex dream sequences, and gliding camerawork, director Lee Myung-se describes his film as "a dark labyrinth of dream and reality," and that instead of using computer graphics, he prefers to "capture the fantasy elements through lighting and emotions."

Plot 
A prominent up-and-coming author Min-woo readies his new much anticipated follow-up novel while suffering from writer's block, as well as frequent nightmares and hallucinations. This unexplainable condition affects both his personal and professional life. Soon he can't differentiate reality from fantasy and continues to have feelings of being chased. His own paranoia leads him to a café in a dark, unassuming alley and encounters a charming young woman named Mimi. Min-woo starts to wonder how he and this girl in front of him are connected and traces long-forgotten memories of his first love.

Cast 
 Gang Dong-won - Min-woo
 Lee Yeon-hee - Mimi
 Gong Hyo-jin - Eun-hye
 Jeon Moo-song - bartender
 Song Young-chang - Company president Jang
 Im Won-hee - Sung-woo
 Lim Ju-hwan - umbrella man
 Seo Dong-soo - editor
 Jung In-gi - doctor
 Kim Dong-hwa
 Yoon Ga-hyun - groom's sister
 Jung Sun-hye
 Choi Dae-sung - Min-woo's friend

Awards and nominations
2007 Korean Film Awards
 Best Cinematography – Hong Kyung-pyo
 Best Art Direction – Yoon Sang-yoon, Yoo Joo-ho
 Nomination – Best Film
 Nomination – Best Director – Lee Myung-se
 Nomination – Best Editing – Ko Im-pyo
 Nomination – Best Visual Effects – Jang Seong-ho
 Nomination – Best New Actress – Lee Yeon-hee

2008 Baeksang Arts Awards
 Nomination – Best Director – Lee Myung-se
 Nomination – Best New Actress – Lee Yeon-hee

2008 Buil Film Awards
 Best Art Direction – Yoon Sang-yoon, Yoo Joo-ho
 Best Lighting – Choi Chul-soo
 Nomination – Best Supporting Actress – Gong Hyo-jin
 Nomination – Best Cinematography – Hong Kyung-pyo

2008 Grand Bell Awards
 Best Art Direction – Yoon Sang-yoon, Yoo Joo-ho
 Nomination – Best Editing – Ko Im-pyo
 Nomination – Best Visual Effects – Jeong Do-an, Yu Yeong-jae
 Nomination – Best Sound – Park Jun-oh

2008 Blue Dragon Film Awards
 Nomination – Best Cinematography – Hong Kyung-pyo
 Nomination – Best Art Direction – Yoon Sang-yoon, Yoo Joo-ho
 Nomination – Best Lighting – Choi Chul-soo

Adaptation
Mimi, a four-episode miniseries inspired by the film, aired on Mnet in 2014.

References

External links 
  
 
 
 

2007 films
2000s psychological drama films
2000s mystery drama films
2000s mystery thriller films
2000s supernatural thriller films
South Korean mystery thriller films
South Korean mystery drama films
South Korean supernatural thriller films
Films directed by Lee Myung-se
2000s Korean-language films
2007 drama films
2000s South Korean films